Connie Mack Berry (April 15, 1915 – June 24, 1980) was an American who played professional football, baseball, and basketball.

Berry was the center for North Carolina State University's basketball team from 1936 to 1938.  He led the Southern Conference in scoring in 1936 and 1937 and won all-conference honors in each of the three years he played. Berry was also a member of NCSU's football team from 1936 to 1938 and baseball team in 1936 and 1937.

After graduation, Berry went on to play for the Oshkosh All-Stars (1939–44) and Chicago American Gears (1944–46) of the National Basketball League.  Berry played in the National Football League starting in 1939 with the Detroit Lions. In 1940, he played for the Green Bay Packers and the Cleveland Rams. From 1942 to 1946, Berry played with the Chicago Bears. He also spent two years in the Chicago Cubs' minor league organization.

References

1915 births
1980 deaths
American football defensive linemen
American men's basketball players
Basketball players from South Carolina
Chicago American Gears players
Chicago Bears players
Chicago Rockets players
Cleveland Rams players
Detroit Lions players
Green Bay Packers players
Minor league baseball players
NC State Wolfpack baseball players
NC State Wolfpack football players
NC State Wolfpack men's basketball players
Oshkosh All-Stars players
Players of American football from South Carolina
Sportspeople from Greenville, South Carolina
Centers (basketball)